Energy is the fifth studio album by The Pointer Sisters, released in 1978 on the Planet label.

History
After a brief split following sister Bonnie's departure from the group, a musically reinvented and recharged Pointer Sisters returned composed of Ruth, Anita and June. Their first album for Planet, this was also the first album produced by  Richard Perry. The record spawned a number two pop smash (and gold-certified single) with a cover of Bruce Springsteen's "Fire". "Happiness" also scored on the US pop Top 40.

Energy became the group's first gold-certified release since 1974's That's a Plenty.  The album was remastered and issued on CD with bonus tracks in 2009 by Wounded Bird Records.

Track listing

Personnel 

The Pointer Sisters
 Anita Pointer – lead vocals (2–4, 7, 9, 10), backing vocals, tambourine (5)
 Ruth Pointer – lead vocals (3–5, 10), backing vocals
 June Pointer – lead vocals (1, 3, 4, 6, 8, 10), backing vocals

Musicians
 David Paich – acoustic piano (1, 4, 6), electric piano (2, 3, 5, 10), organ (7), high piano (7)
 James Newton Howard – Hohner clavinet (3), synthesizers (3, 6, 9, 10), electric piano (4)
 Steve Porcaro – organ (4), synthesizers (9)
 Jimmy Phillips – organ (5), synthesizers (5), acoustic piano (8), organ (8)
 Jai Winding – acoustic piano (7)
 Danny Kortchmar – rhythm guitar (1, 5), electric guitar (3, 4), guitar (8, 10)
 Waddy Wachtel – lead guitar (1, 4, 5), electric guitar (2), slide guitar (3), guitar (6, 10)
 Fred Tackett – acoustic guitar (2), guitar (6, 8), rhythm guitar (9)
 Randy Bachman – acoustic guitar (3)
 Davey Johnstone – slide guitar (5), guitar (7), lead guitar (9)
 David Hungate – bass (1, 2, 5, 6, 8, 10)
 Eddie Watkins Jr. – bass (3)
 Mike Porcaro – bass (4)
 Gerald Johnson – bass (7)
 Abraham Laboriel – bass (9)
 Jeff Porcaro – drums (1, 3–6, 9, 10)
 Rick Jaeger – drums (2, 7)
 Mike Baird – drums (8)
 Lenny Castro – percussion (1, 9), tambourine (7)
 Richard Perry – percussion (8)
 Bryan Cumming – saxophone solo (2)

Production
 Richard Perry – producer
 Dennis Kirk – recording engineer
 Bill Schnee – remix engineer
 Gabe Veltri – assistant engineer
 Doug Sax – mastering engineer at The Mastering Lab (Los Angeles, CA).
 Robin Rinehart – production coordinator
 Kathleen Carey – song coordinator
 Marylin Vance – fashion coordinator
 Kosh – design, art direction
 James M. Shea – photography

Charts

Weekly charts

Year-end charts

Certifications

References

External links
 

1978 albums
The Pointer Sisters albums
Albums produced by Richard Perry
Planet Records albums